Tahla, Morocco is a city  in Taza Province, Fès-Meknès, Morocco , it is located in a mountainous region. Its people are berbers and belong to Beni warayen`s tribes. According to the 2004 census it has a population of 25,655.

References

Populated places in Taza Province